Leohumicola is a genus of fungi first described in 2005.

The following species are accepted within Leohumicola:

 Leohumicola atra
 Leohumicola incrustata
 Leohumicola lenta
 Leohumicola levissima
 Leohumicola minima
 Leohumicola terminalis
 Leohumicola verrucosa

References

Further reading 
 Chen, Juan, et al. "Leohumicola, a genus new to China." Mycotaxon 108.1 (2009): 337–340.

Leotiomycetes